4D or 4-D may refer to:

 4-dimensional spacetime: three-dimensional space of length, width, and height, plus time
 Four-dimensional space

Computers and photography
 4D (software), a complete programming environment including database and web server
 4D SAS, developers of 4D and Wakanda
 4D Inc, a US-based subsidiary of 4D SAS
 4D BIM, a term used in computer aided design
 4D printing
 Cinema 4D, a commercial cross platform 3D graphics application
 SGI IRIS 4D, a line of workstations from Silicon Graphics
 4D, a photo print size for digital cameras

Arts and entertainment
 4D (album), a 2010 album by Matthew Shipp
 "4-D" (The X-Files), an episode of The X-Files
 4D Audio Recording system, an audio recording system developed by Deutsche Grammophon
 4D film, a high technology film experience augmented with physical or environmental effects
 4DTV, a satellite TV broadcasting technology from Motorola
 4DX, a 4D film format
 "4D", a song by Grand Mixer DXT and Bill Laswell from Aftermathematics (2003)
 "4D", a song by Northlane from Alien (2019)
 4D, the production code for the 1975 Doctor Who serial Revenge of the Cybermen

Other
 Class 4-D, a classification of the Selective Service System
 4-D (psychedelic), a psychedelic drug
 4D (train) in Melbourne, Australia
 4-Digits, a lottery in Malaysia and Singapore
 Air Sinai (IATA: 4D)
 Ring finger, the fourth digit (abbreviated 4D) of the hand
 Potez 4D, a four-cylinder aircraft engine

See also
 D4 (disambiguation)
 Fourth dimension (disambiguation)
 Four Dimensions (disambiguation)